Pyrodictium abyssi is a species of heterotrophic marine archaeal hyperthermophile that can grow at . Its type strain is AV2 (DSM 6158).

References

Further reading

External links
LPSN

WORMS entry
Type strain of Pyrodictium abyssi at BacDive -  the Bacterial Diversity Metadatabase

Thermoproteota
Archaea described in 1991